The 1991 SummerSlam was the fourth annual SummerSlam professional wrestling pay-per-view (PPV) event produced by the World Wrestling Federation (WWF, now WWE). It took place on Monday, August 26, 1991, at Madison Square Garden in New York City, New York. Nine matches were contested at the event, including a dark match held before the live broadcast. This was the second event to take place in Madison Square Garden, the first since 1988.

SummerSlam 1991 is remembered for the on-screen wedding of Randy Savage and Miss Elizabeth, dubbed "A Match Made in Heaven" by announcer Gene Okerlund. Savage and Elizabeth had been married in real life since December 1984. WWF personalities shown at the reception afterward included Bobby Heenan, Gene Okerlund, J. J. Dillon, The Undertaker, and Jake Roberts. The last two were uninvited guests. Roberts proceeded to frighten Elizabeth with his snake while Undertaker attacked Savage with an urn.

This was contrasted with "A Match Made in Hell", the main event of the show, which was a handicap tag team match between WWF World Heavyweight Champion Hulk Hogan and The Ultimate Warrior against Sgt. Slaughter, General Adnan, and Colonel Mustafa. It was Slaughter's final on-screen appearance as an Iraqi sympathizer, a storyline fueled by the Gulf War.

Among the other on-screen highlights of the event was The Legion of Doom (Animal and Hawk) defeating The Nasty Boys (Brian Knobbs and Jerry Sags) to win the WWF Tag Team Championship. The team became the only tag team in wrestling history to have held the WWF Tag Team Championship, the NWA World Tag Team Championship, and the AWA World Tag Team Championship. Another highlight was Bret Hart winning his first singles championship in the WWF when he defeated Mr. Perfect for the WWF Intercontinental Heavyweight Championship. After winning the match, Hart climbed into the stands to hug his parents Stu and Helen Hart.

Background
SummerSlam is an annual pay-per-view (PPV), produced every summer by the World Wrestling Federation (WWF, now WWE) since 1988. Dubbed "The Biggest Party of the Summer," it is one of the promotion's original four pay-per-views, along with WrestleMania, Royal Rumble, and Survivor Series, eventually dubbed the "Big Four". It has since become considered WWF's second biggest event of the year behind WrestleMania. The 1991 event was the fourth event in the SummerSlam chronology and was scheduled to be held on Monday, August 26, 1991, at Madison Square Garden in New York City, New York.

Aftermath
Highlights of the wedding reception for Randy Savage and Miss Elizabeth were aired on the WWF's syndicated and cable programs, and included The Undertaker and Jake Roberts crashing the party. Savage – who was still barred from competing as an active wrestler, per his WrestleMania VII "retirement match" loss to the Ultimate Warrior – would become the target of Roberts' insults, which continued to grow through the fall of 1991. Eventually, Savage had enough and, while doing color commentary duties on WWF Superstars, came to the ring while Roberts was delivering an anti-Savage promo, only for Roberts to severely beat Savage, tie him into the ring ropes and allow his devenomized king cobra to bite his arm. The aftermath of that incident led to Savage's reinstatement as an active wrestler and a match at the "This Tuesday in Texas" pay-per-view event. 

Following his team's loss to Hogan and Ultimate Warrior, Slaughter re-evaluated his support of Iraq, acknowledged he had made a bad decision and became a face again, appearing in vignettes next to American landmarks, saying "I want my country back." During an episode of Superstars, Jim Duggan was under attack from The Nasty Boys, and Slaughter made the save. Duggan and Slaughter teamed up to defeat the Nasty Boys and continued to team over the next several months; Slaughter also defeated Colonel Mustafa and General Adnan in a series of matches. Despite Slaughter's face turn, he was still named 1991's "Most Hated Wrestler of the Year" by Pro Wrestling Illustrated magazine for his pro-Iraqi gimmick.

SummerSlam 1991 marked André the Giant's last United States pay-per-view appearance in his lifetime. By now using crutches to get around due to his continuing health problems with acromegaly, André would make several appearances during the WWF's tour of England in September and October 1991. These were his last appearances in the WWF during his lifetime, as he died on January 27, 1993. Also dealing with injuries was Mr. Perfect, who would take a three-month-long absence from the WWF to recuperate; he would return to WWF television as a heel-favoring color commentator on Superstars. He would not return to in ring competition again until the 1992 Survivor Series.

Rick "The Dragon" Steamboat left the WWF before Survivor Series 1991 to return to WCW, Steamboat had been rumored to be "squashed" by The Undertaker to get him ready for his WWF World Title run against Hulk Hogan.  Ted DiBiase would finish up his feud with his former manservant Virgil (and regain his Million-Dollar Belt in the process), quietly remove Sensational Sherri as his valet (who would move to be Shawn Michaels' valet), then team up with Irwin R. Schyster (IRS) to form Money Inc in early 1992.  The Nasty Boys would move on into a feud with the Bushwhackers and the Rockers, which would be settled at Survivor Series.  Power and Glory would split after the events of SummerSlam; Paul Roma departed WWF in October 1991, took some time off, then move to WCW and join the Four Horsemen (instead of Tully Blanchard, who was offered but refused due to low pay) in 1993, and Hercules would also move to WCW in early 1992 and become "The Super Invader" before heading to Japan the following year.

Koko B. Ware would team up with Owen Hart to form "High Energy" and would pursue, unsuccessfully, the WWF World Tag Team titles.

Ultimate Warrior controversy
Off-screen, there was an incident involving The Ultimate Warrior and Vince McMahon at this event. One month before the pay-per-view, Warrior wrote a letter to McMahon threatening to no-show the main event tag team match unless paid $550,000 that he claimed was owed to him from his work at WrestleMania VII. In 2005, it was revealed by Hulk Hogan and Sgt. Slaughter that dealing with the matter physically for Vince McMahon was a possibility when they became aware of Warrior's threat.

McMahon, who did not want Hogan and Slaughter to get into a physical altercation with Warrior, paid Warrior the money, and then fired him immediately following SummerSlam. Warrior later responded on his website to these allegations by stating he was owed money stemming from work performed at WrestleMania VII and that he was actually suspended by McMahon immediately after the show, but quit the WWF out of protest. McMahon would later state that while he couldn't make a last-minute change in the card due to the fans expecting the match, he "could not wait to fire him" after the pay-per-view. Warrior was not present for the in-ring celebration with Hogan and Sid Justice following the match. In the aftermath, Warrior's anticipated feud with Jake Roberts – who, in another storyline that aired a few weeks earlier, had turned heel after tricking Warrior into believing he would aid him in his feud with The Undertaker – was canceled, and the Roberts-Savage feud was conceived instead.

Results

Other on-screen personnel

References

External links
Official 1991 SummerSlam site
onlineworldofwrestling.com – SummerSlam '91 results
twnpnews.com – SummerSlam
wrestlinginformer.net – SummerSlam '91 review
hoffco-inc.com – SummerSlam '91 review

Events in New York City
1991
1991 in New York City
Madison Square Garden
Professional wrestling in New York City
1991 WWF pay-per-view events
August 1991 events in the United States